"Cannonball" Eddie Martin (1903-1966) became the World Bantamweight Champion on December 19, 1924 in a close fifteen round split decision against Abe Goldstein at New York's Madison Square Garden.

He held the title only three months, losing decisively to Jewish boxer Charlie "Phil" Rosenberg in a fifteen round unanimous decision on March 20, 1925 in Madison Square Garden. Martin fought many boxers who at one time held titles, including Featherweight and Jr. Lightweight World Champion Johnny Dundee, Super Featherweight World Champion Tod Morgan, and World Lightweight Champion Al Singer. He also met the lesser known boxers, Johnny Curtin, Willie O'Connell, Johnny Vestri, and Wilbur Cohen.

Early life and career
Hoping originally to play baseball as a short stop in the Major Leagues, Martin quit high school before graduation to pursue a professional career in the ring, against the wishes of his father.  His father, who had been a successful caterer, had white collar ambitions for his son.   Eddie was the sixth of nine sons and five daughters of father Giustino Martino, who managed his large Italian family with his wife in Brooklyn, New York. Several of his older siblings died before he became bantamweight champion.  One of his earliest mentors was boxer Mike Doherty, who recognized his early talent as an amateur and managed him throughout his career.  His other manager was Mel Cooke.

He began fighting in the Brooklyn area in December 1921, winning thirteen of his first fourteen fights, with an impressive five by knockout or technical knockout.

Between November 3, 1922 and November 6, 1924, Martin had an astonishing winning streak of 48 victories and only one draw, winning seventeen by knockout or technical knockout.  He fought in this two year period almost exclusively in the Brooklyn and wider New York area, with four bouts at Madison Square Garden.

World Bantamweight champion
On December 19, 1924, Martin won the World Bantamweight Title against Abe Goldstein in a split decision in fifteen rounds before an impressive crowd of around 13,000 at New York's Madison Square Garden.  Showing boxing dominance at an early age, Martin had only recently turned twenty-one.  He had not been allowed to box in fifteen rounders by the New York State Boxing Commission until reaching that age. Some newspapers wrote that the close bout should have gone to Goldstein and that the match was marred by too much clinching for which Goldstein was cautioned at one point. Though both boxers, particularly Martin, showed aggressiveness in the bout, one newspaper noted "Goldstein weakened toward the end, and it was only by dint of holding that he saved himself from the Cannonballs's rushes." Though "in round twelve Abe's right reached Martin's jaw half a dozen times", Martin seemed to last through Goldstein's best shots.  One source characterized the referee's ruling in the bout as a "razor thin decision."

The Lincoln Star wrote that Goldstein had an advantage in the first six rounds, particularly the third, but that Martin showed aggression and put Goldstein on the defensive so often that he eventually won the decision. Goldstein's trainer Ray Arcel believed that his fighter's dominance in the first six rounds, particularly the third when he knocked down Martin, should have been enough for a decision, but he admitted that the fight was close.

The Ashbury Park Press, agreeing that Martin was the victor, noted that Goldstein seemed to be frequently on the defensive and clinched repeatedly as a reaction to Martin's attack. The Press observed that "although the former champion (Goldstein) was not seriously hurt by the fighting, he was unable to return it in any measure and constantly looped his fingers about his opponent's arms to save himself punishment.  The Press also noted that "round after round saw him (Martin) forcing the fighting giving double for what he received." In short, "Goldstein lost his belt by taking the defensive and acquiescing to the infighting methods that Martin employed."

Loss of Bantamweight Title
Phil Rosenberg, who would defeat Martin for the World Bantamweight Title, had boxed him previously. Rosenberg and Martin met three times, twice in six round decisions and once in a draw. On November 29, 1923 and January 28, 1924, Martin had defeated Rosenberg, in close decisions on points, both times in New York's Madison Square Garden.  In their third meeting, a fast and furious affair on April 29, 1924, Rosenberg had given Martin a closer battle which ended in a ten round draw.

Eddie Martin finally lost the World Bantamweight Title to Jewish boxer Charlie "Phil" Rosenberg in a fifteen round unanimous decision on March 20, 1925 in Madison Square Garden.  In the sweeping victory, the Lincoln Evening Journal wrote "Rosenberg had a clean margin in eleven of the fifteen rounds, and three were even." Martin appeared to have held a slight lead only in the early rounds. The Palm Beach Post noted that Rosenberg won using a "tantalizing left jab and a right uppercut, outboxing Martin at every turn and at the latter part of the match, holding his own in a furious toe-to-toe skirmish."

World Jr. Lightweight Title shot 
On January 23, 1928, boxing at 126 3/4 pounds, he defeated Dominick Petrone, a New York featherweight, in a ten round decision at the Broadway Arena.

On May 24, 1928, Martin met Tod Morgan in a World Junior Lightweight Title bout, losing and taking serious punishment.  A crowd of only 6000 "apathetically" watched the title bout at Madison Square Garden.  Despite the punishment taken by Martin, the bout was close as the Associated Press gave Morgan seven rounds, Martin six and two were even. The Alton Evening Telegraph wrote that "Morgan saved his crown by a brilliant rally in the fifteenth that had Martin groggy as the final bell ended the milling."

In a rematch on July 18, 1928, in another brutal and close fifteen rounds at Ebbets Field in Brooklyn, which drew a larger audience of 20,000, "Morgan came through a storm of punishment...to save the crown in a fifteen round engagement."  The bout had been postponed repeatedly due to inclement weather. The Associated Press had Morgan winning only eight of the fifteen rounds, with Martin taking four and three even, though the fighting was considered close throughout the match.  Typical of Martin's aggressive style of boxing, he pushed for a knockout in the thirteenth and mounted a "lunging, driving attack" against Morgan.

Late boxing career

On July 8, 1929, he lost to Johnny Dundee in a close ten round decision. Dundee had been a former Featherweight and Jr. Lightweight Champion. Though Martin was only 21 years old, he was nearing the end of his more competitive boxing career and losing with greater frequency.  Dundee, who was thirty-six at the time of the bout, was knocked to the canvas in the first round by Martin's hard right to the jaw, but later prevailed in the bout due to a display of more skilled scientific boxing.  In his prime, Dundee had probably been the better boxer.  In a declining boxing career, Martin lost four of his last eight fights after his loss to boxing great Dundee.

On August 28, 1931, Martin fought lightweight champion Al Singer at Coney Island Stadium losing quickly in a second round technical knockout before a substantial but not enormous crowd of four thousand. As the bout was certainly not a title fight, and Martin was a bit past his prime, the attendance was not exceptional.  Referee Jed Gahan stopped the bout to prevent Martin from suffering any further punishment.  Martin, at the end of his career, had probably been somewhat mismatched with younger Al Singer, who had taken the World Lightweight Title on July 17, 1930.  The knockout occurred in 1:31 of the second round.

Life outside boxing
Eddie Martin retired from boxing around 1932. He had a wife Emmy, and a son Martin, Jr.

He died on August 27, 1966 at his home in Brooklyn, New York, though some sources erroneously give his year of death as 1968.  He had been suffering from a heart condition. He was buried at Fort Hamilton Parkway in Brooklyn.

Professional boxing record
All information in this section is derived from BoxRec, unless otherwise stated.

Official record

All newspaper decisions are officially regarded as “no decision” bouts and are not counted in the win/loss/draw column.

Unofficial record

Record with the inclusion of newspaper decisions in the win/loss/draw column.

See also
List of lineal boxing world champions
List of bantamweight boxing champions

References

External links
 
 Eddie Martin - The Cyber Boxing Zone Encyclopedia

1903 births
1968 deaths
Boxers from New York City
World boxing champions
World bantamweight boxing champions
Bantamweight boxers
American male boxers